Ononsky District is an administrative and municipal district (raion), one of the thirty-one in Zabaykalsky Krai, Russia. It is located in the south of the krai, and borders Aginsky District in the north, Borzinsky District in the east, and Akshinsky District in the west. Its administrative center is the rural locality (a selo) of Nizhny Tsasuchey. As of the 2010 Census, the total population of the district was 11,199, with the population of Nizhny Tsasuchey accounting for 30.0% of that number.

History
The district was established on February 5, 1941.

References

Notes

Sources

Districts of Zabaykalsky Krai
States and territories established in 1941
